Bathypluta triphaenella is a species of moth of the family Tortricidae. It is found in Indonesia on the islands of Java and Sulawesi.

The length of the forewings is about 22 mm. The ground colour of the forewings is bright yellowish orange with reddish-brown reticulation (net-like pattern). The hindwings are deep yellowish orange, but black on the basal area.

The larvae have been reported as a minor pest on Camellia sinensis and Cinchona species.

References

Moths described in 1903
Ceracini